Wick Court, Arlingham, Gloucestershire, England is a country house constructed between the late 14th and the mid-17th centuries. Now a base for the charity Farms for City Children, it operates as a traditional livestock farm providing experience of country life for children from urban areas. Wick Court is a Grade II* listed building.

History and description
The Pevsner Architectural Guide, Gloucestershire: The Vale And The Forest of Dean suggests that the earliest part of the court, the south front, dates from the late 14th century. The house was remodelled and enlarged in the mid-17th century, probably for a Thomas Yate. The site is moated and Historic England records that the court was used as a fishing lodge used by the Lords Berkeley and may have been visited by Elizabeth I. In the 20th century, the court was purchased by the charity, Farms for City Children founded by Clare Morpurgo and her husband, the author Michael Morpurgo. Wick operates as a small-scale traditional livestock farm.

Pevsner describes the north front of the house as the "show" front. It is of five bays and three storeys, with a two-storey porch. The top floor of the house was planned as a long gallery, a common Elizabethan feature, but this was never completed. The Historic England listing record for the court, which notes its Grade II* designation, describes Wick as "a remote and almost unaltered example of an Elizabethan house". The barn and animal shelter to the east of the court has its own Grade II listing.

References

Sources
 

Grade II* listed houses
Stroud (district)